The Associação Nacional para o Software Livre (ANSOL) (National Association for Free Software) is a Portuguese non-profit association dedicated to the promotion, development, research and study of Computing Freedom and its social, political philosophical, cultural, technical and scientific implications.

ANSOL is the official Portuguese associate of the Free Software Foundation Europe, and was launched in Porto on 12 October 2001, during the "Porto, Technological City" event.

References

External links
 

Free and open-source software organizations
Science and technology in Portugal
Organizations established in 2001